Vito De Filippo (born 27 August 1963 Sant'Arcangelo) is an Italian politician and member of the Democratic Party. He served as the President of the Italian region of Basilicata from 6 May 2005 until his resignation on 24 April 2013 during his second term.

Biography

Graduated in philosophy with honors, he became a journalist and collaborated with philosophy magazines and various national and local newspapers. He also worked for a local TV. His political activity began at the age of 26 in the Provincial Council of Potenza; he held the office of provincial health Assessor and vice president of the province.

In 1995 he became regional councilor of Basilicata; he held the position of group leader and regional Assessor for Agriculture. In 2000 he was reconfirmed regional councilor and becomes vice president of the Regional Council and regional Assessor for Health. In 2003 he was appointed President of the Regional Council of Basilicata.

In 2005 De Filippo was elected President of the Basilicata region and was re-confirmed in 2010.

On 24 April 2013 the Prosecutor of Potenza arrested two Regional Assessors of the De Filippo Cabinet: the Assessor for Labour Vincenzo Viti (Pd) and the Assessor for Agriculture Rosa Mastrosimone (IdV) as well as the head of the opposition Nicola Pagliuca (PdL), establishing the prohibition of residence for 11 between councilors and former councilors for embezzlement, in the scandal of repayments to regional groups. In the same day De Filippo appointed a new cabinet, the third of the legislature, and presented his resignation as President of the Region. In January 2015, due to the illicit repayments obtained between 2009 and 2010, De Filippo was sentenced by the Court of Accounts of Potenza to "compensate the damage produced to the Basilicata Region" for the amount of 2,641.52 euro. With De Filippo, other 21 administrators and regional councilors were sentenced (including his successor to the presidency of the Region Marcello Pittella), for a total of 196,000 euro.

Subsequently, he was appointed Undersecretary of the Ministry of Health for the Renzi Cabinet and Undersecretary of the Ministry of Education for the Gentiloni Cabinet. In 2018 he has been elected parliamentary Deputy among the ranks of the Democratic Party.

References

Living people
1963 births
Presidents of Basilicata
Politicians of Basilicata
Democratic Party (Italy) politicians
Italia Viva politicians
21st-century Italian politicians
People from the Province of Potenza